Inga balsapambensis is a species of plant in the family Fabaceae. It is found only in Ecuador. Its natural habitat is subtropical or tropical moist montane forests.

References

balsapambensis
Flora of Ecuador
Vulnerable plants
Taxonomy articles created by Polbot